Mbabane Highlanders is a Swati soccer club based in Mbabane. They have won more national titles than any other club, although their most recent league title was in 2001.

Achievements
Swazi Premier League: 13
 1974, 1976, 1980, 1982, 1984, 1986, 1988, 1991, 1992, 1995, 1997, 2000, 2001.

Swazi Cup: 7
 1983, 1985, 1990, 1997, 1999, 2009, 2010.

Swazi Charity Cup: 5
 1998, 2007, 2008, 2010,  2019.

Swazi Trade Fair Cup: 1
 1999.

Bible Cup: 1
 2022

Performance in CAF competitions
CAF Champions League: 1 appearance
2001 – Preliminary Round

African Cup of Champions Clubs: 7 appearances
1977 – withdraw
1981 – First Round
1983 – First Round
1985 – First Round
1987 – First Round
1993 – Preliminary Round
1996 – First Round

CAF Confederation Cup: 4 appearances

2010 – Preliminary Round
2011 – Preliminary Round
2013 - Preliminary Round
[[2022 CAF Confederation Cup - Preliminary round

CAF Cup Winners' Cup: 3 appearances
1981 – withdraw
1984 – First Round
1991 – First Round

Squad
as of 1 May 2018

Staff
Head coach
MR Solly Luvhengo

Assistant Coach
Dumsani Makhanya

Assistant coach/Trainer
Masilonyane

References

Football clubs in Eswatini
1952 establishments in Swaziland
Association football clubs established in 1952
Mbabane